Theretra jugurtha is a moth of the family Sphingidae. It is known from wooded areas in tropical Africa.

The length of the forewings is 37–45 mm. The body and forewings are ochreous olive. The hindwings are dark brown, very much like a large version of Hippotion irregularis.

The larvae feed on Vitis species. The larvae have a green head and body. The dorsal area has large yellow dots. A bluish dorsal line. Pupation takes place in slight cocoon in surface litter.

Subspecies
Theretra jugurtha jugurtha
Theretra jugurtha peracuta Darge, 1989 (Bioko Island)

References

Theretra
Moths described in 1875
Moths of Africa